The Orchid Ensemble is a Canadian musical ensemble formed in 1997 in Vancouver. It is led by Lan Tung from Taiwan on erhu, with Yu-Chen Wang from Taiwan on guzheng and Jonathan Bernard from Canada on various percussion instruments. Former guzheng players include Haiqiong Deng, Mei Han, Geling Jiang, and Bei Bei He.

The trio combines musical traditions from China and elsewhere, and its repertoire ranges from the traditional and contemporary music of China, world music, new music and creative improvisation.

Active in North America, the ensemble gives close to one hundred performances every year, including music festivals, community concerts, primary and secondary school presentations, and university and college residencies. In the United States, they have performed at the Kennedy Center for the Performing Arts, the Smithsonian Institution, the Detroit Institute of Arts and at Benaroya Hall for the Seattle Symphony Society. Canadian performances included Ottawa's National Arts Centre, Canada Day Celebrations, Harbourfront Centre, Vancouver Jazz, Folk and Vancouver International Children's Festival festivals, National Arts Gallery, National Library of Canada, Ottawa Chamber Music Festival, Jazz Festival, and Folk Festival, Sunfest, Halifax’s JazzEast, and Montreal’s Centre Pierre Péladeau.

The Orchid Ensemble actively commissions new compositions, and its repertoire includes works by Mark Armanini, Dorothy Chang, Moshe Denburg, Janet Danielson, Sutrisno Hartana, Hope Lee, Kenneth Newby, John Oliver, Paul Plimley, Farshid Samandari, John Sharpley, Barry Truax, Matthew Tran-Adams, Lan Tung,  David Vayo, Yawen Wang, Jin Zhang, and Rui Shi Zhuo,. Its unique instrumentation provides composers a new vehicle for expression. By performing contemporary works to Folk and World Music audiences while conversely performing traditional music to a New Music audience, the ensemble breaks down boundaries between musical genres.

The Orchid Ensemble’s concert productions represent its commitment to premiering Canadian music and presenting innovative cross-cultural programs. Past collaborators included Flicker Arts Collaboratory, Uzume Taiko, Sutrisno Hartana, Madrigal Singers of Vancouver Community College, Egret Ladies Choir (Taiwan), pianist/composer Ya-wen V. Wang, Iranian santur player Alan Kushan, African percussionist ManDido Morris and Jewish woodwind player Mike Braverman. Special projects included “Road to Kashgar” – a Silk Road project, “Jews in China”- exploring a thousand-years’ connection of the two cultures, “Contemporary Chinese New Year” – contemporary works by Chinese Canadians. These projects have pushed the musicians to expand their vocabulary and develop new musical languages.

Interdisciplinary projects: “Gold Mountain Dream” (2011) explored cultural conflicts and diaspora with multimedia, spoken words and music; “Mountain High River Flow...without end” (2011)  featured animated landscape painting with original music and classic poetry; “Ghost Project” (2008) searched for a connection between humans and spirits through the practices of music, dance, media arts, and scenographic installations; “Triaspora” (2007) explored the Chinese Canadian experience, incorporating Asian traditions with contemporary expression in an exhilarating mix of style, movement and sound; “Parting at Yang Kuan” (2006) brought together Asian poetry and music, enhanced with multimedia and featured poetry reading by Britannia Secondary School students; “Café de Chinitas” (2006) combined fiery Flamenco footwork and Chinese sensitivity with Mozaico Flamenco Dance Theatre. In “Multi Media: Road to Kashgar” (2005), the rhythms, modes and character of the exotic lands of the Silk Road was enhanced by an animated video and imagery environment. The ensemble has so far collaborated with media artists Kenneth Newby, Aleksandra Dulic and Donna Szoke, contemporary Chinese dancers/choreographers Jessica Jone and Changxin Wei, Dervish dancer Raqib Brian Burke, Flamenco dancers/choreographers Oscar Nieto and Kasandra Lea, and Chinese calligraphers Yim Tse and Yukman Lai.

Through educational programs, the Orchid Ensemble attempts to foster understanding and interest in non-western music for the next generation of audiences, promoters, administrators and musicians, as BC’s spokesperson for the UNESCO ASPnet in Canada. At post-secondary institutions, the ensemble gives a variety of lecture-demonstrations, workshops and master classes for both music and other campus departments. The ensemble combines distinct musical traditions in a contemporary framework to inspire and encourage students in their future lives and careers.

The Orchid Ensemble has recorded three CDs. Heartland was nominated for Best Instrumental Music and Best World Music by 2001 West Coast Music Awards. Road to Kashgar was nominated for world album of the Year by 2005 Juno Awards. Life Death Tears Dream won the 2013 International Independent Music Awards.

Discography
Heartland (2000)
Road to Kashgar (2004)
Life Death Tears Dream (2012)

Awards
Independent Music Awards 2013: "Dancing Moon" - Best Eclectic Song.

References

Further reading
 Tran-Adams, Matthew. "Principal Themes: The Orchid Ensemble - Bringing Musical Diversity to Classrooms across Canada." Canadian Music Educator 47:4 (Summer 2006), p. 28-30.

External links
Orchid Ensemble Official site

Musical groups established in 1997
Musical groups from Vancouver
Canadian world music groups
Chinese musical instrument ensembles
1997 establishments in British Columbia